The Kech District is a district located in the Balochistan province of Pakistan.

Administration
The district of Kech is administratively subdivided into the following tehsils, each of which contains several villages:

 Buleda 
 Zamuran
 Turbat
 Mand
 Dasht
 Tump
 Hoshab

Demographics
At the time of the 2017 census the district had a population of 907,182, of which 492,878 were males and 414,202 females. Rural population was 605,162 (66.71%) while the urban population was 302,020 (33.29%). The literacy rate was 62.66% - the male literacy rate was 68.17% while the female literacy rate was 56.17%. 1,710 people in the district were from religious minorities. Balochi was the predominant language, spoken by 97.57% of the population.

Education 

According to the Pakistan District Education Rankings 2017, district Kech is ranked at number 72 out of the 141 ranked districts in Pakistan on the education score index. This index considers learning, gender parity and retention in the district.

Post primary access is a major issue in the district with 77% schools being at primary level. Compare this with high schools which constitute only 10% of government schools in the district. This is also reflected in the enrolment figures for 2016–17 with 33,483 students enrolled in class 1 to 5 and only 2,142 students enrolled in class 9 and 10.

Gender disparity is another issue in the district. Only 38% schools in the district are girls’ schools. This means that girls have to travel longer distances to get education particularly for class 6 and above which is a major hindrance for them.

Moreover, the schools in the district lack basic facilities. According to Alif Ailaan District Education Rankings 2017, the district is ranked at number 132 out of the 155 districts of Pakistan for primary school infrastructure. At the middle school level, it is ranked at number 119 out of the 155 districts. These rankings take into account the basic facilities available in schools including drinking water, working toilets, availability of electricity, existence of a boundary wall and general building conditions. Approximately 1 out 2 schools lack clean drinking water, toilet and a boundary wall. More than 3 out of 4 schools do not have electricity.

References

External links

 Kech District at www.balochistan.gov.pk
 Kech District at www.balochistanpolice.gov.pk

 
Districts of Balochistan, Pakistan